Peripatidae is a family of velvet worms.  The oldest putative representatives of the family herald from Burmese amber dated to the mid-Cretaceous, around 100 Ma, with representatives from Dominican and Baltic amber attesting to a broader distribution in the Palaeogene / Neogene; molecular variability suggests that the family's crown group may have arisen in the early Mesozoic.

Description
The Peripatidae exhibit a range of derivative features. They are longer, on average, than the Peripatopsidae and also have more leg pairs. The number of legs in the Peripatidae varies within species as well as among species and ranges from 19 pairs (in Typhloperipatus williamsoni) to 43 pairs (in Plicatoperipatus jamaicensis). The gonopore is always between the penultimate leg pair. There are no known oviparous species—the overwhelming majority, including all the neotropical Peripatidae, are viviparous with females that develop a placenta to provide the growing embryo with nutrients. The Asian genera Typhloperipatus and Eoperipatus, however, exhibit lecithotrophic ovoviviparity; that is, their females do not develop any placenta and instead retain yolky eggs in their uteri to supply nourishment.

Distribution
The Peripatidae, also known as equatorial velvet worms, are restricted to the tropical and subtropical zones; in particular, they inhabit Central America, the Caribbean, northern South America, Gabon, Northeast India, and Southeast Asia.

Taxonomy

Neopatida 
Neopatida is a monophyletic lineage within the Peripatidae, comprising all peripatids except the few found outside of the Americas. The excluded peripatid genera are the southeast Asian Cretoperipatus and Eoperipatus, the African Mesoperipatus, and the northeast Indian Typhloperipatus.

Genera 
The family consists of the following genera:

 Cretoperipatus Engel & Grimaldi, 2002
 Eoperipatus Evans, 1901
 Mesoperipatus Evans, 1901
 Typhloperipatus Kemp, 1913

 Neopatida

 Cerradopatus Oliveira et al., 2015
 Epiperipatus Clark, 1913
 Heteroperipatus Zilch, 1954
 Macroperipatus Clark, 1913
 Mongeperipatus Barquero-González et al., 2020
 Oroperipatus Cockerell, 1908
 Peripatus Guilding, 1826
 Plicatoperipatus (Grabham & Cockerell, 1892)
 Principapillatus Oliveira et al., 2013
 Speleoperipatus Peck, 1975

References 

Onychophoran families
Bartonian first appearances
Extant Eocene first appearances